Peccato di castità (Italian for "Sin of chastity") is a 1956 Italian comedy film directed by Gianni Franciolini.

Plot 
Adventures of a young married couple during their honeymoon trip. Because of a promise, Valentina has to resort to any trick to prevent the husband to consummate the marriage. The reality is that the woman, terrified by the  suffocating climate existing since the time of their engagement between the families of the couple, made in secret to herself this vote.

Cast 

Giovanna Ralli: Valentina Colasanti 
Antonio Cifariello: Michele Colasanti 
Franco Fabrizi: Peppino Maggi
Mara Werlen: Claretta 
Alberto Talegalli: Carlo, Valentina's father 
Aldo Giuffrè: Vittorio Ricci
Toni Ucci: A young husband at the hotel
Ciccio Barbi: Hotel porter
Corrado Olmi: Hotel manager
Giacomo Furia: Employer of Alitalia
Enzo Garinei: Employer of Alitalia
Miranda Campa: Aunt

References

External links

1956 films
1956 comedy films
Italian comedy films
Films directed by Gianni Franciolini
Films scored by Carlo Rustichelli
Films with screenplays by Age & Scarpelli
1950s Italian films
Italian black-and-white films